Happy Old Year (Thai title: ฮาวทูทิ้ง ทิ้งอย่างไร..ไม่ให้เหลือเธอ) is a 2019 Thai romantic drama film directed by Nawapol Thamrongrattanarit. It was selected as the Thai entry for the Best International Feature Film at the 93rd Academy Awards, but it was not nominated.

Plot
A woman named Jean (Chutimon Chuengcharoensukying) returns home to Bangkok after spending three years in Sweden, and begins to de-clutter her family's house by throwing away anything that has been lying around unused. However, she faces a great challenge when she comes across some items that belonged to her ex-boyfriend named Aim, (Sunny Suwanmethanont). Memories of their past came to Jean and Aim as they try to rekindle their friendship despite breaking up as a result of Jean's lifelong plans to be an interior designer.

Cast
 Chutimon Chuengcharoensukying as Jean
 Sunny Suwanmethanont as Aim
 Sarika Sartsilpsupa as Mi
 Apasiri Chantrasmi as Jean's Mother
 Thirawat Ngosawang as Jay
 Patcha Kitchaicharoen as Pink

Accolades

See also
 List of submissions to the 93rd Academy Awards for Best International Feature Film
 List of Thai submissions for the Academy Award for Best International Feature Film

References

External links
 

2019 films
2019 romantic drama films
Thai romantic drama films
Thai-language films
GDH 559 films